Verizon Business (formerly known as Verizon Enterprise Solutions) is a division of Verizon Communications based in Basking Ridge, New Jersey, that provides services and products for Verizon's business and government clients around the world. 

It was formed as Verizon Business in January 2006 and relaunched as Verizon Enterprise Solutions on January 1, 2012. Between April 2014 and October 2016 its president was Chris Formant. Since November 2016 George J. Fischer was Verizon Enterprise Solutions' President until he was replaced by Tami Erwin. In 2019 Verizon reorganized into three groups, renaming Verizon Business Solutions as Verizon Business.

In July 2022, Sowmyanarayan Sampath replaced Tami Erwin as CEO of Verizon Business.

Overview
Verizon Enterprise Solutions is the division of Verizon Communications that manages Verizon's business and government clients. The division was established as Verizon Business following Verizon's acquisition of MCI Communications in January 2006. The division became Verizon Enterprise Solutions on January 1, 2012 and is based in Basking Ridge, New Jersey. Services provided include advanced communications, information technology, networking, cloud computing and data storage, managed security, machine to machine, and professional consulting. The division's network and services are available in more than 150 countries and it has employees in 75 countries.

Verizon's Business operates 200 data centers in 22 countries, providing cloud, hosting and Internet colocation services to customers. It also has partial ownership in 80 submarine cable networks worldwide, including the SEA-ME-WE 4, Trans-Pacific Express, and the Europe India Gateway systems.

Verizon's Business clients include most of the companies listed in the Fortune 500. John Stratton led the division from January 2012 until April 2014 when Chris Formant was named president of the unit.

Products and services
Verizon's Business provides products and services related to networks, cloud, machine to machine and mobile technologies; data, hosting and storage; and managed security, as well as other wired and wireless offerings.

In addition, the company offers solutions that it tailors to specific vertical markets. These markets include healthcare, financial, retail, government, energy and utilities. The division assesses client's business needs and systems to make recommendations on potential new technologies.

Networks
The company provides Private IP services and networks, as well as managed WAN and LAN services, among other networking services. Verizon also operates a global IP network that reaches 150 countries. In January 2012, Verizon began its Private IP Wireless (LTE) service, which combines 4G LTE with Verizon’s MPLS IP VPN.

Cloud computing and data centers
The division offers cloud and data center services through its eleven cloud-enabled data centers that the company owns and operates throughout the world. Six of these are in the United States, including NAP of the Americas, its flagship Internet exchange point and colocation center. Verizon also owns and operates approximately 50 regional data centers around the world and has network access points in the United States, Europe and Latin America. Verizon Enterprise Solutions is able to offer colocation and managed services through these data centers.

In August 2011, Verizon purchased CloudSwitch. CloudSwitch's software allowed Verizon to offer enterprise clients the ability to use their existing applications with cloud services.

As of May 2014, the division is developing its new fabric-based cloud infrastructure called Verizon Cloud, which is in beta testing for some enterprise customers. Verizon Cloud has two scalable, pay-as-you-go components: Verizon Cloud Compute and Verizon Cloud Storage. A differentiating factor between Verizon Cloud and traditional cloud technology is the ability for users to set capacity and performance of virtual machines. Seven data centers support Verizon Cloud as of May 2014.

As of April 2014, the company's Secure Cloud Interconnect (SCI) service allows enterprise customers to connect their private IP to Verizon's cloud services, and other cloud platforms including Equinix and Microsoft.

In December 2016 Verizon agreed to sell its US data centers business to Equinix Inc for 3.6 billion in cash.  The deal includes 24 facilities across 15 metropolitan markets. For Verizon, the US largest wireless carrier, the deal marks a retreat from the data-centers business five years after it bought Terremark Worldwide Inc. for $1.3 billion, as prospects faded. The sale to Equinix, which is expected to close in the middle of 2017, includes sites in the U.S., Brazil and Colombia. Verizon will still offer data-center services using Equinix as a partner.

Connected devices
Verizon Enterprise Solutions'  machine to machine (M2M) client solutions are frequently custom created for business needs. The division works with a wide range of industries including healthcare, security, transportation, vending, and marketing. Verizon established "Innovation Centers" in both Boston and San Francisco to help clients with M2M development.
 
Examples of Verizon Enterprise Solution's M2M offerings include solutions for communication, infrastructure, digital signage, security, public safety, smart cities, smart meters, and fleet management, as well as asset tracking to remotely monitor data about inventory and resources.

Verizon Enterprise Solutions acquired Hughes Telematics in June 2012, expanding the division's M2M capabilities, particularly in telematics, which deals with vehicle telecommunications and technology. The company is working with the automotive industry in areas of navigation, emergency services, diagnostics, data collection and aftermarket telematics.

In March 2013, after the acquisition, Verizon Enterprise Solutions began offering Networkfleet solutions, a service which tracks and analyzes data about commercial vehicle fleets to help customers optimize routes and manage their fleet vehicles and employees.

Security
Verizon Enterprise Solutions provides security management services for its cloud and mobility products. These include threat management tools and protection services, monitoring, analytics, incident response, and forensics investigations. It also offers identity and access management in both the United States and Europe. In November 2013, Verizon Enterprise Solutions introduced Managed Certificate Services, which provide a cloud-based means for businesses to secure connections and data between various types of machines and devices.

Other products
Additional products and services offered by Verizon Enterprise Solutions include wired and wireless voice, FiOS and data and Internet services. Mobility products offered include mobile workforce manager, mobile application management, and mobility pro services.

See also
List of Internet exchange points
Sprint Corporation
Comcast
AT&T Corporation

References

Verizon Communications
Cloud platforms